Sarah Harris may refer to:

 Sarah Harris (actress), (born 1983) British actress
 Sarah Harris (journalist), (born c, 1981) Australian journalist
Sarah Harris (scientist), British biophysicist
 Sarah Harris Fayerweather (1812–1878), African-American activist

See also
 Sarah Harrison (disambiguation)